Georges Antoine Rochegrosse (2 August 1859 – 7 November 1938) was a French historical and decorative painter.

Life and career
He was born in Versailles and studied in Paris with Jules Joseph Lefebvre and Gustave Clarence Rodolphe Boulanger. His themes are generally historical, and he treated them on a colossal scale and in an emotional naturalistic style, with a distinct revelling in horrible subjects and details.

He made his Paris Salon début in 1882 with Vitellis traîné dans les rues de Rome par la populace (Vitellius dragged through the streets of Rome by the people) (1882; Sens). He followed this the year afterwards with Andromaque (1882–83; Musée des Beaux-Arts de Rouen), which won that year's prestigious Prix du Salon. There followed La Jacquerie (1885; Untraced), Le mort de Babylone (The fall of Babylon) (1891; Untraced), The death of the Emperor Geta (1899; Musée de Picardie, Amiens), and Barbarian ambassadors at the Court of Justinian (1907; Untraced), all of which exemplify his strong and spirited but sensational and often brutal painting. In quite another style and beautiful in colour is his Le Chevalier aux Fleurs (The Knight of Flowers) (1894; Musée d’Orsay, Paris; RF 898).

He was elected an Officer of the Legion of Honour in 1892 and received the Medal of Honour in 1906 for The Red Delight.  Rochegrosse also illustrated several books. Some of the drawings for these illustrations are in the Department of Prints and Drawings at the British Museum, London. He lived his final years in Algeria, but returned to Paris where he died and is buried in Montparnasse Cemetery. His wife, Marie Rochegrosse (née Leblond), had died in 1920.

Selected works
Paintings

Posters

Sources

References

External links

1859 births
1938 deaths
19th-century French painters
French male painters
20th-century French painters
20th-century French male artists
Academic art
Officiers of the Légion d'honneur
Orientalist painters
19th-century painters of historical subjects
Académie Julian alumni
19th-century French male artists